Alexandru Oleinic (born 8 December 1959) is a Moldovan politician,  who was elected as a deputy in the Parliament of the Republic of Moldova in two consecutive legislatures between 2001 and 2009, on the lists of the Electoral Bloc Democratic Moldova. Between 2009 and 2011 he was Minister of Information Technologies and Communications of the Republic of Moldova in the First Vlad Filat Cabinet.

On November 17, 2012, at the 2nd Congress of the People's Party of Moldova, he was elected as a co-chairing coordinator. He is the founder  of the "Youth for Moldova" charity fund and the founder of the Institute of Political and Social Technologies, the president of the "National Fund for Investment Attraction and Protection" and  the chairperson of the board of directors of the "Millennium Management Group".

Biography 
Alexandru Oleinic was born on December 8, 1959, in Cupcini. He is a member of the Party Alliance Our Moldova.

Education
 1966-1976: General School of Cupcini, Edineț District.
 1976-1981: Polytechnic Institute of Chisinau, Faculty of Mechanics
 1985-1988: State University of Moldova, Faculty of Economic Sciences

Professional activity
 1982-1996:  started at the position of the foreman and ended up as a general manager of SA "Monolit" (Soroca);
 1996- 1998: General Manager of  the Tractor Plant in Chisinau SA "TRACOM";
 1998-2000: General Manager of the State Property Administration and Privatization Department;
 2000-2001: General Manager of the National Investment Agency;
 2001-2005: Member of the Parliament of the Republic of Moldova, Member of the Commission for Economic Policy, Budget and Finance;
 2005-2009: Member of the Parliament of the Republic of Moldova, Member of the Commission for Social Protection, Health and Family;
 On September 25, 2009, by the Decree of the President of the Republic of Moldova No 4 - V, the Minister of Information Technologies and Communications.
 2009- 2011:  Minister of Information Technologies and Communications ;
 2012–present: President of the "National Fund for Investment Promotion and Protection";
 2013–present: Chairman of the Management Board of "Milenium Management Group";

Political activity
 1997- 2002: run for the parliament election  on the lists of the Social Democratic Party "Furnica". Member of the National Council of the Social Democratic Party "Furnica";
 2001-2005: Elected to the Parliament on the list of electoral block "Braghis Alliance". Member of the Committee on Economic Policy, Budget and Finance;
 2002-2003: Member of the National Council of the Social-Democratic Alliance of Moldova;
 2003- 2011: Member of the National Council "Our Moldova" Alliance;
 2005-2009: MP in the Parliament of the Republic of Moldova – Democratic Moldova Election Bloc. Member of the Commission for Social Protection, Health and Family;
 2007-2009: Member of the Inter-Parliamentary Commission Russia-Moldova. Member of the OSCE Parliamentary Assembly;
 2012: Co-chairman of the People's Party of Moldova.

Social work and honors
 2005:  established "Youth for Moldova" charity foundation
 2009: One of the founders of the Institute of Political and Social Technologies
 On December 1, 2009, Alexander Oleinic was awarded the Medal of Honor for his exceptional government activity in promoting democratic reforms and legislation.
 2010: Initiator and organizer of the "IYouth - The Future Starts With You" National Contest. He also holds the first contest. He was awarded the Medal of BOFR, BOU, and the Orthodox Church of Moldova.

Family
Alexandru Oleinic is married and has a child.

External links 
 Government of Moldova

References

 

Living people
1959 births
People from Edineț District
Moldova State University alumni
Moldovan economists
Moldovan engineers
Our Moldova Alliance politicians
Moldovan MPs 2001–2005
Moldovan MPs 2005–2009
Recipients of the Order of Honour (Moldova)